Sarıaydın (also known as Sarıaydınlı) is a village in Silifke district of Mersin Province, Turkey. At  it is a situated in the Toros Mountains.

References

Villages in Silifke District